Polyrhanis is a genus of beetles in the family Cicindelidae, containing the following species:

 Polyrhanis ancorifera (W.Horn, 1897)
 Polyrhanis arfakensis Matalin & Wiesner, 2008
 Polyrhanis aruana (Dokhtouroff, 1887)
 Polyrhanis barbata (W.Horn, 1895)
 Polyrhanis bennigsenia (W.Horn, 1901)
 Polyrhanis boisduvali (W.Horn, 1896)
 Polyrhanis cheesmanae (Nidek, 1954)
 Polyrhanis cristobalica Cassola, 1987
 Polyrhanis declivis (W.Horn, 1900)
 Polyrhanis delicata (Bates, 1874)
 Polyrhanis denudata (W.Horn, 1935)
 Polyrhanis deuvei Cassola, 1986
 Polyrhanis excisilabris (W.Horn, 1905)
 Polyrhanis fakfakensis Cassola & Werner, 1996
 Polyrhanis funerata (Boisduval, 1835)
 Polyrhanis gressitti Cassola, 1986
 Polyrhanis guineensis (W.Horn, 1892)
 Polyrhanis holgeri Schule, 1998
 Polyrhanis holynskii Wiesner, 2000
 Polyrhanis innocens (W.Horn, 1893)
 Polyrhanis innocentior (W.Horn, 1904)
 Polyrhanis jo (W.Horn, 1900)
 Polyrhanis kampeni (W.Horn, 1913)
 Polyrhanis kibbyi Cassola, 1987
 Polyrhanis klynstrai (Nidek, 1954)
 Polyrhanis korupuncola Wiesner, 1999
 Polyrhanis latipalpis Cassola, 1987
 Polyrhanis loriai (W.Horn, 1897)
 Polyrhanis microgemmea (W.Horn, 1932)
 Polyrhanis neopupilligera Cassola & Werner, 2001
 Polyrhanis oceanica (Cassola, 1983)
 Polyrhanis olthofi (Nidek, 1959)
 Polyrhanis paulae Cassola, 1986
 Polyrhanis perrinae Cassola, 1986
 Polyrhanis placida (Schaum, 1863)
 Polyrhanis plurigemmosa (W.Horn, 1937)
 Polyrhanis postmarginata Cassola, 1987
 Polyrhanis pseudopupillata (W.Horn, 1938)
 Polyrhanis pseudopupilligera Cassola, 1986
 Polyrhanis pupillata (Schaum, 1863)
 Polyrhanis pupilligera (Chaudoir, 1865)
 Polyrhanis ribbei (W.Horn, 1895)
 Polyrhanis riedeli Cassola & Werner, 1996
 Polyrhanis samuelsoni Cassola, 1986
 Polyrhanis sedlaceki Cassola, 1987
 Polyrhanis toxopeusi (Nidek, 1959)
 Polyrhanis tuberculifera Cassola, 1986
 Polyrhanis vannideki Cassola, 1986
 Polyrhanis variolosa (Blanchard, 1842)
 Polyrhanis vitiensis (Blanchard, 1842)
 Polyrhanis waigeoensis Cassola & Werner, 2001

References

Cicindelidae